The Irish Open and originally known as the Irish Lawn Tennis Championships and for sponsorship reasons also known as  Carroll's Irish Open was a men's and women's tennis tournament held at the Fitzwilliam Lawn Tennis Club in Dublin, Ireland. Before the creation of the International Lawn Tennis Federation and the establishment of its world championship events in 1913, it was considered by players and historians one of the four most important tennis tournaments to win. the others being Wimbledon, the U.S. National championships and the Northern Championships. The men's event was part of the pre-open era tour from inception until 1967. It was then part of the open era non-aligned independent tour (1968–69). From 1970 to 1974, it was an event on the Grand Prix tennis circuit. The women's event was on the same tours as the men except for when it became part of the Women's Tennis Association (WTA) Tour from 1971 to 1973. The men's edition was played until 1979, and the women's ended in 1983.

The Irish Open is currently a tournament on the ITF World Tennis Tour, the lowest tier of professional tennis.

History
The Irish Championships were first held in June 1879, two years after Wimbledon started. It was first staged at Pembroke Place, Dublin  until 1880 when it transferred to Wilton Place  where it remained till 1902. In 1903 the tournament moved again this time to Fitzwilliam Square. The championships began 2 June 1879  the tournament had the distinction of being the first event to feature men's and women's singles and doubles tournaments as well as a mixed doubles competition. Prior to the creation of the International Lawn Tennis Federation and the establishment of its world championship events in 1913 it was considered by players and historians one of the four most important tennis tournaments to win.  the others being Wimbledon, the U.S. National championships and the Northern Championships. The tournament changed its name to the Irish Open in 1972 and again it moved location to Appian Way, Dublin where it remained for the duration of its run. The tournament has been played on multiple surfaces throughout its history. The first two years, (1879–1880) were competed on hard courts. It was played on grass courts, (1881–1939). From 1946 to 1965, it was played on clay courts, and it returned to being played on grass again from 1966 until the tournament ended.

Past finals

Men's singles

Women's singles

Men's doubles

Women's doubles

Mixed doubles

References

External links
Doherty, R.F. et al. (1903): R. F. & H. L. Doherty on Lawn Tennis. Baker and Taylor Co., New York. p. 169–173. (online)
Irish Championships retrieved from tennisarchives.com on 2012/09/24

Grass court tennis tournaments
Sport in County Dublin
Tennis tournaments in Ireland
WTA Tour
1879 establishments in Ireland
Recurring sporting events established in 1879
ITF World Tennis Tour